The 1982 TAA Formula Ford Driver to Europe Series was an Australian motor racing competition for Racing Cars complying with Australian Formula Ford regulations. It was the thirteenth annual Australian national series for Formula Fords.

The series was won by Jeff Summers driving an Elfin 620B.

Schedule

The series was contested over eight rounds.

Round 2 was to be held at an Oran Park meeting in March but, after that meeting was cancelled, an additional round was scheduled at a meeting at the same circuit in August.

Points system
Points were awarded on a 20, 15, 12, 10, 8, 6, 4, 3, 2, 1 basis for the first ten places at each round.

Series standings

Cars were powered by 1.6 litre Ford engines, as mandated by Australian Formula Ford regulations.

References

Australian Formula Ford Series
TAA Formula Ford Driver to Europe Series